Arbanas may refer to:

Arbanasi people, community in the Zadar region of Croatia

People with the surname Arbanas
Constantin Arbănaș (born 1983),  Romanian footballer
Fred Arbanas (1939–2021), American football player
John Arbanas (born 1970), Australian tennis player

See also
Arbana (disambiguation)
Arbanasi (disambiguation)